Club Social y Deportivo Chamelco is a Guatemalan football club from San Juan Chamelco, Alta Verapaz Department. It was founded in 2015 and currently plays on the Tercera División de Ascenso.

References 
Fedefut Guatemala
Club Social Y Deportivo Chamelco

Football clubs in Guatemala
Association football clubs established in 2015
2015 establishments in Guatemala
Alta Verapaz Department